Promotion is a 2013 Bengali film. The film was directed by Snehasish Chakraborty. The story of the film revolves around the competitive corporate world.

Plot 
Don makes an ad, where he tries to promote the sexy model, Lakshmi. He is confident that his AV would get an easy approval. But all hell breaks loose when Sapru informs that his ad has been rejected. A furious Don starts passing nasty comments about Sapru’s wife, Gunja, present on the floor. Sapru finds himself at crossroads when a few colleagues suggest that Sapru should introduce Gunja as the new model.

Cast 
 Paoli Dam as Gunja
 Indraneil Sengupta as Supratim aka Sapru
 Mamata Shankar as Madhabilata
 Abhishek Chatterjee as Don
 Subhasish Mukhopadhyay
 Kanchan Mullick as a publisher
 Milind Gunaji as Nishant Sharma
 Anannya Biswas as Lakshmi

Production 
This was Snehasish Chakraborty's debut feature film.  After directing Bengali television serials like Tapur Tupur and Bhalobasha.com Chakraborty made this film.

See also 
 Tolly Lights

References 

Bengali-language Indian films
2010s Bengali-language films
2013 directorial debut films
2013 films